Shaun Pearce (born 13 December 1969 in Reading, Berkshire) is a British slalom canoeist who competed in the 1990s. He won four medals at the ICF Canoe Slalom World Championships with three golds (K1: 1991, K1 team: 1993, 1997) and a bronze (K1 team: 1995). He also won the World Cup series in K1 in 1994.

Pearce also finished 25th in the K1 event at the 1996 Summer Olympics in Atlanta.

World Cup individual podiums

References

External links

1969 births
English male canoeists
Canoeists at the 1996 Summer Olympics
Living people
Olympic canoeists of Great Britain
Sportspeople from Reading, Berkshire
British male canoeists
Medalists at the ICF Canoe Slalom World Championships